The Moldova national baseball team is the national baseball team of Moldova. The team represents Moldova in international competitions.

National sports teams of Moldova
National baseball teams in Europe